Marseilles Township is one of the thirteen townships of Wyandot County, Ohio, United States.  The 2010 census found 480 people in the township, 112 of whom lived in the village of Marseilles.

Geography
Located in the southwestern part of the county, it borders the following townships:
Mifflin Township - north
Pitt Township - northeast
Salt Rock Township, Marion County - southeast
Grand Prairie Township, Marion County - south
Goshen Township, Hardin County - southwest
Jackson Township - northwest

The village of Marseilles is located in southern Marseilles Township.

Name and history
It is the only Marseilles Township statewide.

Government
The township is governed by a three-member board of trustees, who are elected in November of odd-numbered years to a four-year term beginning on the following January 1. Two are elected in the year after the presidential election and one is elected in the year before it. There is also an elected township fiscal officer, who serves a four-year term beginning on April 1 of the year after the election, which is held in November of the year before the presidential election. Vacancies in the fiscal officership or on the board of trustees are filled by the remaining trustees.

References

External links
County website

Townships in Wyandot County, Ohio
Townships in Ohio